Sergey Chepiga (born 5 June 1982) is a Russian hurdler. He competed in the men's 110 metres hurdles at the 2004 Summer Olympics.

References

1982 births
Living people
Place of birth missing (living people)
Russian male hurdlers
Olympic male hurdlers
Olympic athletes of Russia
Athletes (track and field) at the 2004 Summer Olympics
Russian Athletics Championships winners